Olga Törös (4 August 1914 – 16 February 2015) was a Hungarian gymnast who competed at the 1936 Summer Olympics in Berlin, where she won a bronze medal in the women's team competition. Born in Debrecen, she was selected for the 1936 Games by a delegation attending a national tournament that was being held in her home town. Following the Olympics she received a degree in Physical Education from Semmelweis University and moved to Kecskemét in 1939, where she worked as a teacher for thirty five years. She received the Woman's Lifetime Achievement Award from the Hungarian Olympic Committee in 2011 and turned 100 in August 2014. She died on 16 February 2015 at the age of 100.

See also
 List of centenarians (sportspeople)

References

1914 births
2015 deaths
Hungarian centenarians
Hungarian female artistic gymnasts
Olympic gymnasts of Hungary
Olympic bronze medalists for Hungary
Gymnasts at the 1936 Summer Olympics
Olympic medalists in gymnastics
Sportspeople from Debrecen
Medalists at the 1936 Summer Olympics
Women centenarians
20th-century Hungarian women
21st-century Hungarian women